KTRR (102.5 MHz, "Retro 102.5") is a commercial FM radio station broadcasting a classic hits radio format. Licensed to Loveland, Colorado, United States, the station is currently owned by Townsquare Media.

History
On February 2, 1966, the station signed on as KLOV-FM.  It was the FM counterpart to AM 1570 KLOV (now KXJJ).  KLOV-FM originally simulcast the AM station.  It later aired an automated easy listening format.  In the 1980s, it switched to a mix of easy listening and soft adult contemporary music.  Ninety percent of the playlist was vocals.

Through the next twenty-five years, it operated as an adult contemporary or soft adult contemporary station.  For a time in the early 2000s, TRI 102 flirted with a Hot AC format before returning to mainstream AC a few years later.

During the 2010, 2012, 2013, and 2014 holiday seasons, TRI 102.5 played all Christmas music, which ran each year from 8 a.m. on November 15 until midnight on December 26.

In 2015 TRI 102 went in a new direction, changing from soft AC to a more current-based format.  The station discontinued the evening syndicated Delilah show which the new Sunny 107 picked up.  For a time, TRI 102.5 was considered the hot AC station for Fort Collins and Northern Colorado.

The makeover failed to raise ratings, and on September 9, 2016, KTRR flipped to classic hits, retaining the "Tri 102.5" name and most of its 1980s and 90s hits, but dropping all post-2000 music and bringing back some 1970s titles.

On March 22, 2019, KTRR rebranded as "Retro 102.5".

References

External links

TRR
Classic hits radio stations in the United States
Loveland, Colorado
Mass media in Fort Collins, Colorado
Radio stations established in 1966
1966 establishments in Texas
Townsquare Media radio stations